Harding is an unincorporated community in Freedom Township, LaSalle County, Illinois, United States,  north of the county seat of Ottawa.

Demographics

Background 
When surveyors began to determine the size of the area, Harding was to be approximately one square mile; however, Harding is only 1/2 of a mile in length from north to south and 1/5 mile wide. Crooked Leg Creek runs along the southern border. Containing less than fifty houses, this town has a population of less than 150. The village has a United Methodist Church, volunteer fire fighting station, small cemetery and Harding Grade School. A small community building, centralized in the town, is used nearly every month to host a bluegrass music show. The mail is delivered by postal carriers from the nearest post office in Earlville.

References 

Unincorporated communities in LaSalle County, Illinois
Unincorporated communities in Illinois